Midland Township, Nebraska may refer to one of the following places:

 Midland Township, Gage County, Nebraska
 Midland Township, Merrick County, Nebraska

See also: Midland Township (disambiguation)

Nebraska township disambiguation pages